Invite the Light is the second solo studio album by American modern-funk musician Dâm-Funk. It was released on September 4, 2015 via Stones Throw Records. Recording sessions took place at Funkmosphere Lab in Ladera Heights, California. Production was handled by Dâm-Funk himself, with co-producers Junie Morrison and Henning, and Peanut Butter Wolf serving as executive producer. It features contributions from Ariel Pink, Computer Jay, Flea, Jane Jupiter, JimiJames, Jody Watley, Joi, Junie Morrison, Leon Sylvers III, Leon Sylvers IV, Nite Jewel, Novena Carmel, Q-Tip, Snoop Dogg, and I-Ced.

On the chart dated October 10, 2015, the album debuted at number 25 on the Billboard Top R&B Albums chart in the United States.

Critical reception

Invite the Light was met with generally favorable reviews from music critics. At Metacritic, which assigns a normalized rating out of 100 to reviews from mainstream publications, the album received an average score of 77, based on eighteen reviews.

Track listing

Personnel

Damon "Dâm-Funk" Riddick – main artist, producer, recording
Walter "Junie" Morrison – featured artist & co-producer (tracks: 1, 16)
Jonathan "Q-Tip" Davis – featured artist (track 4)
Jason "Computer Jay" Taylor – featured artist & synthesizer (track 6)
Michael "Flea" Balzary – featured artist & bass guitar (track 6)
Marcus "Ariel Pink" Rosenberg – featured artist & synthesizer (track 11)
Leon Frank Sylvers III – featured artist & mixing (track 13)
Leon Frank Sylvers IV – featured artist (track 13)
Joi Gilliam – featured artist (track 14), backing vocals (tracks: 2, 15)
Calvin "Snoop Dogg" Broadus – featured artist (track 14)
Henning Renema – co-producer (track 14), drum programming & keyboards (track 14)
Cedric "I, Ced" Norah – backing vocals (track 15), engineering
Melisa "Jane Jupiter" Young – featured artist (track 15)
JimiJames – featured artist (track 15)
Jody Watley – featured artist (track 15)
Ramona "Nite Jewel" Gonzalez – featured artist (track 15)
Novena Carmel – featured artist (track 15)
Wes Osborne – mastering
Chris "Peanut Butter Wolf" Manak – executive producer 
Keith Eaddy – creative director
Freddy Anzures – art direction & design
Brian "B+" Cross – photography
Wes Harden – management

Charts

References

External links

2015 albums
Dâm-Funk albums
Stones Throw Records albums